Sasha Alexander Gilbert (Russian: Саша Александр "Алекс" Гилберт; born 1 April 1992) is a Russian born, New Zealand adoption advocate, writer and presenter. He is the founder of the organisation I'm Adopted which he established in 2015.

Gilbert, whose name at birth is Gusovskoi Alexander Viktorovich, was born in Arkhangelsk and was placed in the local orphanage for the first two years of his life until he was adopted by his New Zealand parents in 1994. In 2013, he started searching for his Russian genetic parents, with whom he had no connection. He found his genetic mother and then his genetic father, who did not know about Gilbert's existence until Gilbert contacted him in 2013.

In 2015, Gilbert established I'm Adopted for adopted people to share their stories as well as a support network for adoptees. Gilbert has been nominated for several awards for his adoption work including, Young New Zealander of the Year in 2018 and New Zealander of the Year in 2020.

Gilbert has made several appearances on television shows and documentaries about international adoption as well as writing two books. Besides advocacy, Gilbert has worked in media and television as well as regularly publishing videos to his own YouTube channel. In 2022, Gilbert presented the TVNZ series, Reunited. He was also a writer for the program.In late 2022, Gilbert started to publish his own adoption series, An Adoption Story, through his YouTube channel.

Early life 

Alex Gilbert was born Gusovskoi Alexander Viktorovich on 1 April 1992 in Arkhangelsk, Russia, to Mihail Viktorovich Kovkov and Tatiana Taimurazovna Gusovskaia. Gilbert's mother placed him in a Russian orphanage in Arkhangelsk after he was born. His genetic father Mihail did not know of Gilbert's existence until 2013 after hearing through a series of online messages that Gilbert was searching for him. Gilbert's father's name on his birth certificate and adoption papers was falsified.

In 1994, Gilbert and his brother Andrei were adopted by a New Zealand couple, Mark and Janice Gilbert. His name was legally changed to Sasha Alexander Gilbert in 1994. He grew up in Whangarei, New Zealand, and lived there until he was 18 years. He moved to Auckland at the beginning of 2011 to study and work in television.

Career

2013–2014: My Russian Side 
After an unsuccessful attempt in 2009, Gilbert recommenced for his birth parents in 2013. He used Russian social networking websites and eventually located them. In November 2013, Gilbert travelled to Russia to meet them for the first time. This trip and his meetings with his birth parents was filmed for New Zealand's TV One's Sunday current affairs program, and was broadcast in 2014. He wrote and released his autobiographical book My Russian Side in 2014 along with an autobiographical documentary film.

2015–present: I'm Adopted
In July 2015 Gilbert established the I'm Adopted project to allow other adopted people to share their stories. The project is a platform that helps adoptees around the world to share their personal experiences with adoption through social media. The project also works to bring adoptees together through meet ups and events. The project is available in English, Russian and Spanish with the help of contributors and translators worldwide.

At the end of 2015, Gilbert appeared on Russian 1TV television station's Let them Talk programme highlighting the project and his adoptive New Zealand parents meeting his Russian biological parents for the first time. Gilbert also helps organise support groups and meet ups with the I'm Adopted project for adopted people. The project was registered as a New Zealand charitable trust at the beginning of 2017. In February 2017, Gilbert was a key speaker at an event at the New Zealand Parliament to help raise awareness for I'm Adopted and its projects.

In October 2017 Gilbert went to Russia to revisit his orphanage in Arkhangelsk. This was the first time Gilbert revisited the orphanage since he left in 1994.

 Gilbert also talked with adopted teenagers and parents in Moscow for a charity that focuses on adoption, Arifmetika Dobra. Gilbert also met Anna Kuznetsova, the former Children's Rights Commissioner for the Russian Federation, which was also headquartered in Moscow.

Gilbert shared a video on his experience of him meeting his birth father for the first time on the social news website Reddit in November 2017, going viral and also being published to the LADbible Facebook page. In January 2018, Gilbert appeared in a Russian documentary The Man from Nowhere «Человек из ниоткуда» which was directed by Russian journalist and documentary writer, Katerina Gordeeva. In July 2018, Gilbert spoke via video at the International Conference on Adoption Research 6 conference in Montreal, Canada as well as hosting the first I'm Adopted overseas meet up in Galway, Ireland, on 1 August 2018.

In June 2019, Gilbert hosted the first podcast based on the I'm Adopted project. Gilbert contributed with the Rudd Adoption Program for the University of Massachusetts Amherst in September, 2020.

I'm Adopted was established as a registered Charity in New Zealand, September, 2020.

2018: I'm Adopted book and orphanage supplies 

In early 2018, Gilbert independently released his second autobiography, I'm Adopted. A full-length interview that was based on the book was released in late June. Gilbert collected and hand-delivered supplies for his orphanage in Arkhangelsk, Russia in October 2018.

In January 2019, the Russian version of his autobiography titled «Я – приёмный сын» (I'm an Adopted Son) in English, was released with a physical limited release with support of the Timchenko Foundation in Moscow, Russia. The book is published by Alpina Books, Russia.

2021: Residing in Russia 
In the beginning of 2021, Gilbert started to reside temporary in Russia, mostly around inside the Moscow region Gilbert had been documenting his time there by publishing videos to his YouTube Channel. He also met again with his birth mother Tatiana in Rybinsk as well as his birth father, Mihail and his family in Saint Petersburg. He had also visited his place of birth, Arkhangelsk as well as a village inside the Vladimir Oblast and Altai Krai in the Western Siberian region. Gilbert also completed filming for Reunited during his time there. After almost six months, by the end of July 2021, Gilbert went back to New Zealand.

2019-2022: Reunited 
In September 2019, TVNZ announced that Gilbert will be hosting his own television series, Reunited. The show focuses on his work with I'm Adopted and the help with adopted people finding their birth families. The filming for Reunited was finished in 2021. As well as being the presenter for the series, Gilbert also served as one of the writers and the narrator. Season One aired, February 2022 on TVNZ 1 with positive reception, noting Gilberts compassion towards the adopted person. The series was also noted for its cinematography.

2022-present: An Adoption Story 
From November 2022, Gilbert began to publish his first online series, An Adoption Style (styled as an Adoption story) through his YouTube channel. The series is supported by the online genealogy platform MyHeritage.

Personal life 

Gilbert is of East Europe, Russian, Baltic and West Asian ancestry.

Impact of the 2022 Russian invasion 
Gilbert noted on his Facebook page about the impact of the 2022 Russian invasion on his family in Russia and his relatives living in a village north of Kyiv, Ukraine. His relatives in Ukraine are the brother and niece of his birth mother, Tatiana.

Achievements 
In 2018, Gilbert was nominated for Young New Zealander of the Year, as part of the 2019 New Zealander of the Year Awards as well as a nomination for New Zealander of the Year. He also received a certificate of achievement from the Ministry of Health of the Arkhangelsk region in Russia for his orphanage initiative in November, 2018.

In November 2020, Gilbert became a Finalist for the 2020 New Zealand Impact Awards, as part of the Global Category.

Books 
My Russian Side (Моя Русская семья) (2014)  
I'm Adopted (Я — приемный сын) (2018)

Filmography 
(Titles that are related to his adoption advocacy)

References

External links

I'm Adopted official website

Living people
1992 births
People from Whangārei
People from Arkhangelsk
New Zealand autobiographers
Russian emigrants to New Zealand